There have been four baronetcies created for persons with the surname Dundas, one in the Baronetage of Great Britain and three in the Baronetage of the United Kingdom. One creation is extant as of 2008.

The Dundas Baronetcy, of Kerse in the County of Linlithgow, was created in the Baronetage of Great Britain on 16 November 1762. For more information on this creation, see the Marquess of Zetland.

The Dundas Baronetcy, of Richmond in the County of Surrey, was created in the Baronetage of the United Kingdom on 22 May 1815 for the surgeon David Dundas. The title became extinct on the death of the fourth Baronet in 1868.

The Dundas Baronetcy, of Beechwood in the County of Midlothian, was created in the Baronetage of the United Kingdom on 24 August 1821 for Robert Dundas. He was succeeded by his son David, the second Baronet. Three of his six sons, the third, fourth and fifth Baronets, all succeeded in the title. The latter was succeeded by his son, the sixth Baronet. He was childless and on his death in 1981 at the age of 99, the title became extinct.

The Dundas Baronetcy, of Arniston in the County of Midlothian, was created in the Baronetage of the United Kingdom on 18 June 1898 for Robert Dundas. The title became extinct on the death of the seventh Baronet in 1970.

Dundas baronets, of Kerse (1762)
see the Marquess of Zetland

Dundas baronets, of Richmond (1815)

Sir David Dundas, 1st Baronet (died 1826)
Sir William Dundas, 2nd Baronet (1777–1840)
Major-General Sir James Fullerton Dundas, 3rd Baronet (died 1848)
Admiral Sir John Burnet Dundas, 4th Baronet (1794–1868)

Dundas baronets, of Beechwood (1821)

Sir Robert Dundas, 1st Baronet (1761–1835)
Sir David Dundas, 2nd Baronet (1803–1877)
Sir Sydenham James Dundas, 3rd Baronet (1849–1904)
Sir Charles Henry Dundas, 4th Baronet (1851–1908)
Sir George Whyte Melville Dundas, 5th Baronet (1856–1934)
Sir Robert Whyte-Melville Dundas, 6th Baronet (1881–1981)

Dundas baronets, of Arniston (1898)
Sir Robert Dundas, 1st Baronet (1823–1909)
Sir Robert Dundas, 2nd Baronet (1857–1910)
Sir Henry Herbert Philip Dundas, 3rd Baronet (1866–1930)
Sir Philip Dundas, 4th Baronet (1899–1952)
Sir Henry Matthew Dundas, 5th Baronet (1937–1963)
Sir James Durham Dundas, 6th Baronet (1905–1967)
Sir Thomas Calderwood Dundas, 7th Baronet (1906–1970)

Notes

References
Kidd, Charles, Williamson, David (editors). Debrett's Peerage and Baronetage (1990 edition). New York: St Martin's Press, 1990,

External links
History of the Dundas of Arniston family
Dundas of Richmond

Baronetcies in the Baronetage of Great Britain
Extinct baronetcies in the Baronetage of the United Kingdom
1762 establishments in Great Britain
1815 establishments in the United Kingdom
Baronetcies created with special remainders
Clan Dundas